Blackfish is a 2013 American documentary film directed by Gabriela Cowperthwaite. It concerns Tilikum, an orca held by SeaWorld and the controversy over captive orcas. The film premiered at the 2013 Sundance Film Festival on January 19, 2013, and was picked up by Magnolia Pictures and CNN Films for wider release. It was nominated for the BAFTA Award for Best Documentary.

Synopsis

The documentary concerns the captivity of Tilikum, an orca involved in the deaths of three people, and the consequences of keeping orcas in captivity. The coverage of Tilikum includes his capture in 1983 off the coast of Iceland and his purported harassment by fellow captive orcas at Sealand of the Pacific. Cowperthwaite argues these incidents contributed to the orca's aggression.

The film includes a testimonial from Lori Marino, director of science with the Nonhuman Rights Project. Cowperthwaite also focuses on SeaWorld's claims that lifespans of orcas in captivity are comparable to those in the wild, typically 30 years for males and 50 years for females, a claim the film argues is false. Other people interviewed include former SeaWorld trainers, such as John Hargrove, who describe their experiences with Tilikum and other captive orcas.

The documentary argues that the wild-caught orcas experienced extreme stress when captured as juveniles, and spending a lifetime in aquariums being forced to perform and breed lead to aggression toward other orcas and humans. The film features footage of attacks on trainers by Tilikum and other captive orcas as well as interviews with witnesses.

Development

Cowperthwaite began work on the film after the February 2010 death of Tilikum's trainer Dawn Brancheau and in response to the claim that the orca had targeted Brancheau because she had worn her hair in a ponytail. Cowperthwaite argued that this claim had been conjecture and that "there had to be more to this story".

The film premiered at the 2013 Sundance Film Festival on January 19, 2013, and was picked up by Magnolia Pictures and CNN Films for wider release.

Release
Blackfish premiered at the Sundance Film Festival on January 19, 2013. Shortly after, Magnolia Pictures and CNN Films acquired US distribution rights to the film, releasing the film on July 19, 2013, with Dogwoof Pictures acquiring international rights. Dogwoof sold the film to multiple buyers for international territories, including Netflix for the UK, Scandinavia and Latin America (the latter two would later go to Universal) and Universal Pictures for Asia, Africa, Portugal, Italy and several other territories. However, in 2021, for unexplained reasons, Netflix removed Blackfish from their platform.

Reception

Critical response
On Rotten Tomatoes, a review aggregator, the film has a score of 98% based on 132 reviews with an average rating of 8/10. The site's critical consensus states, "Blackfish is an aggressive, impassioned documentary that will change the way you look at performance killer whales." On Metacritic, which assigns a weighted average score to reviews from mainstream critics, the film received an average score of 83 out of 100 based on 33 critics indicating "universal acclaim." The Deseret News called it "a gripping example of documentary filmmaking at its finest".

Box office
In release for 14 weeks, the film earned $2,073,582 at the North American domestic box office.

Response from trainers
After the film's release, former SeaWorld trainer Bridgette Pirtle said the final film was "a complete '180' from what was originally presented to me." In earlier statements, Pirtle praised the film's direction and supported its message. Mark Simmons, one of Tilikum's first trainers, believed few of his interview comments were used "because the things I said flew in the face of the movie's clear agenda. What I contributed did not support Gabriela or Tim Zimmerman's intent with the film."

Michael Scarpuzzi, the vice president for zoological operations and trainer for SeaWorld San Diego, says the film uses Brancheau's death and gruesome details to "not inform the public, but, rather regrettably, because of the desire to sensationalize." He states, "We have altered how we care for, display and train these extraordinary animals. We have changed the facilities, equipment and procedures at our killer whale habitats. The care and educational presentation of these animals at SeaWorld has been made safer than ever. Does Blackfish inform its viewers of that fact? No, it does not."

In January 2014, the family of the late trainer Dawn Brancheau said neither they nor the foundation named after her were affiliated with the film, and that they did not believe it accurately reflected Brancheau or her experiences.

Response from SeaWorld

SeaWorld Entertainment refused to take part in the production of Blackfish, and later claimed the film was inaccurate, saying in a statement:

SeaWorld also responded with an open letter rebutting the claims. The Oceanic Preservation Society and The Orca Project, a non-profit organization focusing on orca in captivity, responded with open letters criticizing SeaWorld's claims. Marine researcher Debbie Giles also offered rebuttals to SeaWorld, finding its assertions inaccurate. SeaWorld considers the film to be propaganda.

On December 31, 2013, the Orlando Business Journal posted a poll asking if Blackfish had changed readers' opinions on SeaWorld. The majority of votes stated that the film had not. It was later found that 180 out of 328 votes (55%) originated from a single SeaWorld-hosted IP address. SeaWorld defended the voting, stating that "each of the votes that came from a SeaWorld domain were cast by team members who are passionate about the incredible work SeaWorld does and the experiences our parks provide."

SeaWorld also created a section of its website titled "Truth About Blackfish," addressing the claims stated above and highlighting what it considered other problems with the film. This section of the website is no longer active.

On February 27, 2014, SeaWorld filed a complaint with the U.S. Department of Labor, claiming that Lara Padgett, the Occupational Safety and Health Administration investigator, had behaved unethically by aiding the filmmakers. Cowperthwaite denied claims of improper collaboration.

Starting in the summer of 2014, SeaWorld, as Eric Davis, created a number of public relations websites such as Awesome Ocean, Stand With Sea World, and I Love SeaWorld, in an effort to share their view, counter what they believed were inaccuracies happening in the public debate, and repair their brand.

Impact

SeaWorld
SeaWorld announced afterward it had suffered a $15.9 million loss, which CEO Jim Atchison attributed in part to high ticket prices and poor weather.

Overall attendance at SeaWorld parks and Busch Gardens declined by 5% in the first nine months of 2013, though it was unclear if the drop in attendance was due to the influence of the film. SeaWorld claimed attendance figures for its three marine parks — Orlando, San Diego and San Antonio — in the last three months of 2013 were at record levels for that quarter.

In response to the film, New York State Senator Greg Ball proposed legislation in New York that bans keeping orcas in captivity. In March 2014, California State Assemblyman Richard Bloom introduced the Orca Welfare and Safety Act, a bill in California that would ban entertainment-driven orca captivity and retire all current whales. In June 2014, U.S. Congressmen Adam Schiff and Jared Huffman attached an amendment to the Agriculture Appropriations Act, requiring the USDA to update regulations under the Animal Welfare Act of 1966 in regards to cetacean captivity. It passed with "unanimous bipartisan support." The bill allocates 1 million USD to studying the impacts of captivity on marine mammals. Schiff cited Blackfish as raising public concern.

After the release of Blackfish, Southwest Airlines came under pressure to end its 26-year relationship with SeaWorld. Southwest responded that it was aware of concerns and was "engaged" with SeaWorld over them, but that the partnership would continue. In July 2014, it was announced that the partnership would not be renewed. A press release stated that the break was mutual and based on "shifting priorities". The petitioning by activists was cited as a possible factor for the split.

In August 2014, SeaWorld announced that attendance and revenue were down about 1% to 2% for the second quarter of 2014 compared with the second quarter of 2013. Additionally, SeaWorld stock prices dropped by 33%. The company attributed the decline to the proposed government legislation related to the documentary. In November 2014, SeaWorld announced that attendance at the parks had dropped 5.2% from the previous year and profits had fallen 28% over that quarter. As of November 2014, the company's stock was down 50% from the previous year.

In September 2014, the Rosen Law Firm PA announced an investigation into "potential securities claim" on behalf of SeaWorld investors. According to the firm, SeaWorld "acknowledged for the first time the negative publicity may have had a hit and may have been why the attendance has been flat for now and the past quarters." The firm will investigate if SeaWorld was aware of the impact and "chose to downplay that as a reason for its performance results." In September 2014, the Rosen Law Firm filed a class action lawsuit. It alleges that SeaWorld "misled investors by claiming the decrease in attendance at its parks was caused by Easter holiday and other factors" rather than the release of Blackfish and improper practices.

SeaWorld said in August 2014 that the film had hurt revenues at its park in San Diego. On December 11, 2014, SeaWorld announced that chief executive Jim Atchison would resign, with an interim successor replacing him on January 15, 2015. The company's share price had fallen 44% in 2014.

In August 2015, SeaWorld announced a 3% drop in revenue and an 84% drop in net income for the second quarter of 2015 when compared to the previous year. Attendance fell 1.6%, from 6.58 million to 6.48 million.

In November 2015, SeaWorld announced plans to end killer-whale shows at its theme park in San Diego. In March 2016, SeaWorld announced it would end its orca breeding program and begin to phase out all live performances using orcas. In a statement regarding the decision, the company said, “Society is changing and we’re changing with it."

In 2018, SeaWorld and former CEO James Atchison agreed to pay over $5 million to settle federal charges that the company hid from investors the negative impact that Blackfish had on the business. As part of the indictment, according to the Securities and Exchange Commission, Atchison sold Seaworld stock in the first quarter of 2014 in order to hide the loss in revenue.

Other media
Reaction to the documentary prompted the bands and singers Heart, Barenaked Ladies, Willie Nelson, Martina McBride, .38 Special, Cheap Trick, REO Speedwagon, Pat Benatar, The Beach Boys, Trace Adkins, and Trisha Yearwood to cancel their concerts at the "Bands, Brew & BBQ" event at SeaWorld Orlando and Busch Gardens Tampa in 2014.

The ending to the Disney/Pixar film Finding Dory was revised after director Andrew Stanton and then-chief creative officer John Lasseter saw Blackfish and spoke with director Gabriela Cowperthwaite. The depiction of a marine park in the film was altered.

The film Paper Towns, based on the book by John Green, had scenes featuring SeaWorld cut. Producer Wyck Godfrey explained, "Since [John] wrote the book, the documentary [Blackfish] came out. I think it's a little less playful to go to SeaWorld now."

Director Colin Trevorrow admitted that the animal rights themes in the 2015 film Jurassic World were inspired by Blackfish, with elements of the hybrid dinosaur Indominus rex and the fictional theme park in the film inspired by Tilikum and SeaWorld, respectively.

Soundtrack
Composer Jeff Beal composed the original score, recording a small orchestra at his house in Agoura Hills. While no physical CDs were produced, the score is available for download on iTunes. In July 2016, the Hollywood Chamber Orchestra premiered the concert version of the score, live-to-picture, at the Montalban Theater, conducted by Beal.

Home media
Blackfish was released on DVD and Blu-ray on August 26, 2013 in the UK (Region 2, PAL). Its U.S. release was on November 12, 2013.

The documentary was broadcast on CNN on October 24, 2013. After the broadcast, CNN aired an Anderson Cooper special with Jack Hanna, Gabriela Cowperthwaite, Naomi Rose and Jack Hurley. This was followed by a special edition of Crossfire with Blackfish associate producer Tim Zimmermann debating Grey Stafford, a conservationist, zoologist, and member of the International Marine Animal Trainers Association.

The documentary aired on BBC Four in the UK on November 21, 2013 as part of the Storyville documentary series.

See also

 Animal attacks
 Killer whale attacks on humans
 Incidents at SeaWorld parks
 Non-human animal personhood
 Nonhuman Rights Project
 The Whale (2011 film)
 Orca (film)

References

External links
 
 
 
 

2013 films
2013 documentary films
CNN Films films
Documentary films about animal rights
Documentary films about environmental issues
Documentary films about ocean life
Documentary films about water and the environment
Films about dolphins
Films about whales
Films directed by Gabriela Cowperthwaite
Films scored by Jeff Beal
Films set in amusement parks
Blackfish
SeaWorld Orlando
SeaWorld Parks & Entertainment
2010s English-language films
2010s American films